Congrés is a station on line 5 of the Barcelona Metro.

The station is located underneath Carrer Garcilaso, between Carrer Matanzas and Carrer Francesc Tàrrega Claret. It was opened in 1959.

The side-platform station has a ticket hall on either end, each with one access.

Services

External links

 Congrés at Trenscat.com

Railway stations in Spain opened in 1959
Barcelona Metro line 5 stations